Álvur Zachariasen (born June 5, 1931) is a former Faroese foreman, teacher, and politician for the Home Rule Party. 

Zachariasen was born in Klaksvík, the son of Símun Petur Zachariasen and Maria Henriksen. He is also the nephew of the writer and politician Louis Zachariasen. Zachariasen graduated as a ship's captain in 1957 and was a foreman at the Lauritzen shipping company from 1955 to 1964, after which he held an equivalent position at the Faroe Ship shipping company until 1971. After this he was a teacher at the Klaksvík Nautical School from 1972 to 1998.

Zachariasen was a member of the municipal council for Klaksvík from 1980 to 1997. He also served as a representative of the Norðoyar district for the Home Rule Party in the Faroese Parliament from 1994 to 1998.

Parliamentary committees 
1994–1998: head of the Business Committee
1994–1998: member of the Finance Committee
1994–1998: member of the Industry Committee
1994–1998: member of the Fisheries Committee

References

Further reading
 Dahl, Árni. 2002. Løgtingið 150. Hátíðarrit. Vol. 2. Tórshavn, p. 361.

Members of the Løgting
People from Klaksvík
Faroese politicians
1931 births
Living people